Protégé: The Battle for the Big Break is a 2011 reality-based singing talent show created by Real Florido for GMA Network. It is hosted by Ogie Alcasid, as the journey host, Dingdong Dantes as gala presenter, and Jennylyn Mercado, the show's reality host. It is the first season of GMA's reality talent program, Protégé.

The show was first intended to be a "talent search" similar to StarStruck and Protégé might have been the replacement of the said show.

This show is stapled the timeslot between the two talent shows from other rival shows with ABS-CBN's Pilipinas Got Talent and TV5's Talentadong Pinoy.

The result reveals right after the performance. The first two results nights were shown one hour after the performance of the finalists. The judges, on the other hand are happy that their opinions matter in this contest, since the results will not depend solely on text votes.

Overview

In Protégé: The Battle for the Big Break, 10 legendary music icons groom their own bets to be music's biggest phenomenon. As the competition open its doors to a wide array of talent, performances are bound to be spectacular and exciting. But this is not only a battle for the aspirants.

With revered and lauded mentors who have established their names in the music industry also vying for the same prize, drama and tension will sure arise. Their reputation and credibility at stake, their mentoring techniques will also be scrutinized.

Mentors and judges

Mentors
Aiza Seguerra
Claire de la Fuente
Gloc-9
Imelda Papin
Janno Gibbs
Jaya
Jay-R
Joey Generoso
Rachelle Ann Go
Rey Valera

Judges
Joey de Leon (Face-off and Gala Judge)
Bert de Leon (Face-off and Gala Judge)
Louie Ocampo (Gala Judge)
Homer Flores (Face-off Judge)
Eula Valdez (Gala Judge)

Guest judge
Cherie Gil (October 30, 2011, Finals December 18, 2011)

Auditions

Dubbed in the show as The Hunt, the mentors were tasked to roam around the country and scour different provinces and cities to find the best music acts that may become their bets for the competition.

This is the first level of the competition wherein the mentors will invade their assigned audition sites.

The mentors will be the guide of the protégés. They will groom and help the contestants to stay in the competition. A mentor's role is make his or her protégé shine.

They will be aided by two Audition Masters in searching for their protégés. These two audition masters are renowned starmaker Jojie Dingcong and GMA Artist Center Head Arsi Baltazar.

Aspiring protégés will come from two sources. First is the pre-screening done by the Audition Masters before the Regionals Proper. Second are the aspirants personally invited by the mentors based on the research that the staff conducted.

When faced with the mentors, the aspiring protégés will hear Yes if they are to be considered for the next round or No if they are not. Those who got a Yes will be pooled and the mentors will choose only three each that they will take with them to Manila.

Face-off round
After the provincial auditions in The Hunt round, the mentors are left with three protégés each, completing the Top 30 protégés. This is considered to be the semi-final round.

These Top 30 protégés competes with each other in the face-off round where individual acts performs in front of the three judges. The judges then tell the mentors which of the three should be their protégé that they will pit against the other mentors' protégés.

Thus, at the end of the face-off round, every mentor will only have one protégé each. Only ten protégés will compete in the next round.

Top 30 face-off contenders

Finalists

Winner
 Krizza Neri (RnB Sistah) (born June 28, 1995) is from Cagayan de Oro, Philippines and was 16 years old at the time of the show. She auditioned at SM City Cagayan de Oro in front of the assigned mentor, Aiza Seguerra with Beyoncé Knowles' "Halo and Nicki Minaj's "Super Bass". She also performed "No One" in the Face-off Round. Neri was announced as the winner on December 18, 2011.

Runners up
She auditioned at SM City Iloilo in front of the assigned mentor, Janno Gibbs with Train's "Hey, Soul Sister. She also performed "I Will Survive" by Gloria Gaynor and Pussycat Dolls' "Hush Hush". During the show, she said that she is dedicating her entire performances in the competition for her brother who just died recently due to brain tumor. Bermudez was announced as the runner-up with Lovely Embuscado on December 18, 2011.
Lovely used to sing in front of her pet pigs. She was 12 years at the time of the show. She auditioned at SM City Davao in front of Jaya with Celine Dion's "Then You Look at Me". She sang "Hurt" in the face-off round and advanced to the finals. She was eliminated on November 20, 2011 but was able to come back due to the wildcard round. Embuscado was announced as the runner-up with Lirah Bermudez on December 18, 2011.

Top 10

Jensen Teñoso ("The Sultry Charmer") (born September 29, 1993) is from Batangas and celebrated her 18th birthday at the time of the show. She auditioned at SM City Batangas wherein she was chosen as one of the protégés of the assigned mentor, Claire de la Fuente. She performed Destiny's Child's "Stand Up for Love in the face-off round and advanced to the finals. Teñoso was eliminated on December 11, 2011 and came in fourth or fifth place with Nomer Limatog, Jr..
 Nomer Limatog, Jr. ("Bibong Showstopper") who hails from Cebu is the official protégé of the Rachelle Ann Go. Joining the competition at the age of 10, he is the youngest among the finalists. He sang "Don't Stop Believin' by The Journey in the face-off round. Limatog was eliminated on November 13, 2011 but was able to comeback due to the wildcard round. Limatog finished in fourth or fifth place with Jensen Teñoso on December 11, 2011.
 Kenneth Monico ("Soul Heartthrob") (born September 18, 1991) who represents Cabanatuan is the official protégé of the Jay-R. While in the audition, Monico said that he recently suffered from dengue before joining the show. He auditioned at NE Pacific Mall and chose as one of Jay-R's protégés. He sang Boyz II Men's "On Bended Knee" in the face-off round and advanced to the finals. He was eliminated on December 4, 2011 and came in sixth or seventh place with Rey Valera's So Wat?.
 So Wat? ("Lovesome Foursome") is the only group entry in this competition. They are Janina Gonzales, Kyrsty Alde, Sander Sigurdson and Ermund Regacion, who auditioned individually; the group was formed by their mentor, Rey Valera. The day before the face-off round, the two girls finally came back to the show as the mentor thought that Janina and Kyrsty would not join anymore since they were not allowed at first by their respective parents. They performed "Ain't No Mountain High Enough" in the face-off round with negative comments. They were eliminated on December 4, 2011 and came in sixth or seventh place with Kenneth Monico. Prior to their elimination, So Wat? had never been in the bottom group.
 Denise Barbacena ("Sweet Siren") (born October 31, 1994) is a 16-year-old aspiring singer in the time of the show representing Manila. She is the official protégé of Gloc 9. After her audition, Gloc 9 told her that she has that "magic" that Gloc 9 has been looking for. She advanced to the finals in the face-off round with Faith Cuneta's "Pag-ibig Ko'y Pansinin". She was eliminated on November 6, 2011 and finished in eighth place.
 Samantha Felizco ("Urban Pop Gurl") who auditioned from Dagupan is the official protégé of Joey Generoso. Felizco is originally from Marikina as it was seen on the television during her audition. Joey's way of mentoring Samantha is through exposing her in Side A's concerts as an opening act. With Adele's "Rolling in the Deep" in the face-off round, she advanced to the finals. She got eliminated on October 30, 2011 and came in ninth place.
 Rosalyn Navarro ("Prima Biritera") is the official protégé of Imelda Papin representing the Bicol Region. She sang Dolly Parton's "I Will Always Love You" in the face-off round that gave her a spot in the finals. She was eliminated on October 23, 2011 and came in tenth place.

Finals

Top 10 (first week) – Protégé's Pick

Top 10 (second week) – Song of my Kababayan
The protégés' kababayan (town-mate) chose the song for their favorite via Facebook poll.

Top 9 – Switch
A mentor chooses a competition piece for a rival protégé.
Guest Judge: Cherie Gil

Joey de Leon was out of the country by that time and so Cherie Gil takes the seat as a guest judge.

Top 8 – My Shining Moment
The Protégé-Mentor tandems should outshine their opponents with their chosen live gala piece.

Note: Pinoy Pride was the original theme for the week which was later changed to My Shining Moment.

Top 7 – Duet with My Mentor

Top 6 – My Pinoy Battle Song
Original Pilipino Music (OPM) songs with a twist.

Wild Card 
The 5 ex-Protégés battle to regain a spot in the contest.

Top 7 (again) – Dance Hits Remixed

Top 5 – My Song, My Life

Top 3 – Duet with My Mentor / My Greatest Performance

Group performance: "Perfect" (Pink)

Elimination chart
Color key:

The Final Battle (finale episode) 
In the finale episode aired live on December 18, 2011 on GMA Network and on some feeds of GMA Pinoy TV, on other feeds the program was aired as "recorded" although it did not say so but instead the Protégé logo was replaced where the "LIVE" would usually be on the original airing, all of the top three were given a 4-year STI Education for Real Life Scholarship and a 5-year contract with GMA Artist Center. Lovely Embuscado was the Texter's Choice Awardee given PhP50,000 and an exclusive Fanatxt contract from GMA New Media, Inc. and she also received the Sky Flakes Biggest Break Award which composed of PhP100,000. The winner was Krizza Nerri, the RNB Sistah. She received a PhP3,000,000 2-Bedroom Condo Unit from Suntrust Properties, Inc. and PhP1,000,000 from GMA as well as a five-year contract that the other two also received. On GMA Pinoy TV, several parts were unaired or edited out, such as Arnel Pineda's performance and the third round of the top three's performance which featured the song "Perfect" by Pink. As in past, it may have been with copyright issues with the songs featured and performed that caused those parts to be edited out and unaired internationally. But other non-copyright parts were unaired/edited out as well such as the judges final words on the three protégés and Krizza and Aiza's words after winning.

Results show performances

Group song 
 Top 10: Song mashup of "Under Pressure" / "Ice Ice Baby" by Queen ft. David Bowie / Vanilla Ice
 Top 8 Mentors: Medley of "Lean on Me" by Bill Withers and "I'll Stand by You" by The Pretenders
 Top 7 Protégés (Week 5): "Don't Wanna Go Home" by Jason Derulo
 Rank 7-10 Protégés: "Breakaway" by Kelly Clarkson
 Top 5 Protégés (Week 7): Mashup of "Mangarap Ka" by Afterimage and "Pagsubok" by Orient Pearl
 Top 7 Protégés (Week 8): "Flashdance... What a Feeling" by Irene Cara
 Top 5 Protégés (Week 9): "Moves Like Jagger" by Maroon 5

See also
List of programs broadcast by GMA Network
Are You the Next Big Star?
StarStruck
Pinoy Idol
Pinoy Pop Superstar

References

External links
Protégé: The Battle for the Big Break on Facebook
Protégé: The Battle for the Big Break at IMDb

2011 Philippine television seasons
Protégé (TV series)